The 2016 Barnsley Metropolitan Borough Council election was held on 5 May 2016 to elect one third of the members of Barnsley Metropolitan Borough Council in England. The election was held on the same day as the election of a Police and Crime Commissioner for South Yorkshire as part of the 2016 Police and Crime Commissioner elections.

By-elections between 2016 and 2018

References

2016 English local elections
2016
2010s in South Yorkshire

